Civil Aircraft Missile Protection System or CAMPS is an infrared countermeasure against infrared-homed anti-aircraft missiles, specifically designed to defend civilian aircraft flying under  against MANPADS.  

The system was developed by Saab Avitronics, Chemring Countermeasures and Naturelink Aviation. 

The decoys use a pyrophoric substance that burns at a relatively low temperature, thereby avoiding any fire safety concerns associated with conventional pyrotechnic military flares, such as those used by a similar Israeli system.  The onboard processor uses neural network pattern recognition algorithms to classify potential threats detected by its infrared sensors.  The system was successfully demonstrated at the Overberg Test Range in March 2007.

See also
 Flight Guard
 ALQ-144 - Infrared guided missile countermeasure system
 Northrop Grumman Guardian
 Directional Infrared Counter Measures
 Common Infrared Countermeasures program
 2002 Mombasa hotel bombing - attack was co-ordinated with the shootdown attempt.
 List of airliner shootdown incidents

References

External links

Saab official web site

Aircraft emergency systems
Missile countermeasures